Friso Cabinho Mando (born 9 June 1990 in Brokopondo) is a Surinamese footballer who plays as a midfielder. He played at the 2014 FIFA World Cup qualifier.

References

1990 births
Living people
Association football midfielders
Surinamese footballers
Suriname international footballers
SVB Eerste Divisie players
People from Brokopondo District
21st-century Surinamese people